The following is a list of the MTV Europe Music Award winners and nominees for Best Finnish Act.

1990s

2000s

2010s

See also 
 MTV Europe Music Award for Best Nordic Act

MTV Europe Music Awards
Finnish music awards
Awards established in 2005